Maria Roth-Bernasconi (born 14 September 1955) is a Swiss politician who had served in the legislature and been former co-president of the women's chapter of the Social Democratic Party of Switzerland. As an MP she criticized Micheline Calmy-Rey's wearing a white headscarf to meet the Iranian President.

References 

1955 births
Living people
Members of the National Council (Switzerland)
Social Democratic Party of Switzerland politicians
Women members of the National Council (Switzerland)
21st-century Swiss women politicians
21st-century Swiss politicians